Shenguiyeh-ye Pain (also Romanized as Shengū’īyeh-ye Pā’īn; also known as Shengūyeh-ye Soflá) is a village in Jowzam Rural District, Dehaj District, Shahr-e Babak County, Kerman Province, Iran. At the 2006 census, its population was 17, in 4 families.

References 

Populated places in Shahr-e Babak County